Maurice Victor Barnhill (1887–1963) was an associate justice (1937–1954) and chief justice (1954–1956) of the North Carolina Supreme Court.

Barnhill was born in Halifax County, North Carolina on December 5, 1887 and attended the University of North Carolina Law School.  He was a prosecutor in Nash County, North Carolina and was elected to the North Carolina House of Representatives, serving in 1921. He was a Nash County judge and a state superior court judge before Governor Clyde R. Hoey appointed him to the state Supreme Court on July 1, 1937.

As a superior court judge, Barnhill presided over the murder trial that followed the Loray Mill Strike.

He was subsequently elected to the Supreme Court in 1938 and re-elected in 1946. Barnhill was appointed Chief Justice by Governor William B. Umstead on February 1, 1954, and he was elected to the post on November 2, 1954.

References

Archive of NC Manual

1887 births
1963 deaths
Members of the North Carolina House of Representatives
Chief Justices of the North Carolina Supreme Court
20th-century American judges
20th-century American politicians